L'Isle-sur-le-Doubs is a commune in the Doubs department in the Bourgogne-Franche-Comté region in eastern France.

Geography
The town lies at the foot of a cliff, so expansion took place on the other side of the river Doubs.

History
The town of l'Isle-sur-le-Doubs was formed from the merging of the villages of Fusnans, Carnans, and Uxelles. It belonged originally to the abbey of Les Trois Rois, and was then ceded to the Count of Neufchâtel, who built his castle there in 1230, only the foundations of which remain.

Population

The inhabitants of the commune are called l'Islois.

Tourism
The commune has a three-star camping ground and attracts many tourists who go fishing in the Doubs. Hiking trails are also numerous in the surrounding countryside.

See also
 Communes of the Doubs department

References

External links

 L'Isle-sur-le-Doubs on the intercommunal Web site of the canton 

Communes of Doubs